Vilmos Zombori (11 January 1906 in Temesvár, Austria-Hungary (now Romania) – 17 January 1993) was a Romanian footballer who played as a goalkeeper.  He was also known as William Zombory.

Biography 

At club level, he spent his career in Liga I with Chinezul Timișoara and Ripensia Timișoara.

With the Romania national football team, he was picked by joint coaches Josef Uridil and Costel Rădulescu to play in the 1934 World Cup in Italy. During this competition, the team were eliminated in the first round, after a 2–1 defeat to Czechoslovakia.

Record 

As of 5 September 2010, he holds the record for the most goals scored by a goalkeeper in the Romanian First League, with a total of 5.

Honours 
Chinezul Timișoara
Liga I (1): 1926–27
Ripensia Timișoara
Liga I (4): 1932–33, 1934–35, 1935–36, 1937–38
Cupa României (2): 1933–34, 1935–36

References

External links 
 
 
 An article about Zombori (Romanian)

1906 births
1993 deaths
Sportspeople from Timișoara
Romania international footballers
Romanian sportspeople of Hungarian descent
Romanian footballers
1934 FIFA World Cup players
Liga I players
FC Politehnica Timișoara players
FC Ripensia Timișoara players
Association football goalkeepers